Maria Chiara Cascavilla (born 26 April 1995) is an Italian long-distance runner. She competed in the women's half marathon at the 2020 World Athletics Half Marathon Championships held in Gdynia, Poland.

In 2019, she competed in the women's 5000 metres at the Summer Universiade held in Naples, Italy. She finished in 6th place in the final.

References

External links 
 

Living people
1995 births
Place of birth missing (living people)
Italian female long-distance runners
Competitors at the 2019 Summer Universiade